Cho Jung-myung (born 24 December 1993 in Seoul) is a South Korean luger. He competed at the 2014 Winter Olympics

References

External links 
 
 
 

1993 births
Living people
South Korean male lugers
Olympic lugers of South Korea
Lugers at the 2014 Winter Olympics
Lugers at the 2018 Winter Olympics
Lugers at the 2022 Winter Olympics